Modern World or The Modern World may refer to:

Modern World (magazine), originally Modern Wonder, a 1937–1941 British magazine for boys
The Modern World, a late-1970s British music fanzine published by Gary Crowley
The Modern World (novel), a 2007 novel by Steph Swainston
"The Modern World" (song), by the Jam, 1977
"Modern World", a song by Anouk from Who's Your Momma, 2007
"Modern World", a song by Wolf Parade from Apologies to the Queen Mary, 2005

See also 
Modern history, the period from about 1500 to the present
Modernity, a topic in the humanities and social sciences
This Modern World, a weekly satirical comic strip by Tom Tomorrow
This Modern World (album), by Stan Kenton, 1953